Mengen may refer to:

 Mengen, Bolu, a town and district in Bolu province, Turkey
 Mengen, Germany, a town in Baden-Württemberg
 Mengen, Yığılca
 Mengen language, a language of Papua New Guinea